Robert Clerk was a Member of Parliament for Truro in 1386. There is no other information recorded of them.

References

14th-century births
Year of death missing
English MPs 1386
Members of the Parliament of England for Truro